ntpdate is a computer program used to quickly synchronize and set computers' date and time by querying a Network Time Protocol (NTP) server.  It is available for a wide variety of unix-like operating systems.

The accuracy and reliability of ntpdate entirely depends on the accuracy and network link stability of the first server it connects with.  As this inaccuracy can lead to a multitude of problems, the maintainers have decided to deprecate it in favor of only using the ntpd (network time protocol daemon) or a  sntp (simple network time protocol) query.

References

External links
 NTP.org — Home page of the Network Time Protocol

Network time-related software